Bedfordia arborescens, known as the blanket leaf, is a shrub or small tree of south eastern Australia. It occurs in or around temperate rainforests in areas of high altitude. The natural range of distribution on the mainland is from the Otway Ranges and Wilsons Promontory (39° S) in the far south east of the Australian continent to Monga National Park (35° S) near Braidwood, New South Wales. There is also an isolated occurrence in Tasmania on Cape Barren Island. Other common names are blanket bush, flannel leaf and tree blanketleaf.

Description
Usually 3 to 6 metres in height, sometimes reaching 12 metres tall and a 45 cm trunk diameter. The long leaves and their woolly white underside makes it easy to identify. Blanket Leaf is often crooked and asymmetrical. The trunk is not straight, irregular in cross section but not buttressed. The main branches form close to the ground.

Small branches covered in a whitish felt. Older branches covered in stringy and flaky brown bark. Leaves alternate, entire, wavy edged. White underneath, dull green above. 15 to 24 cm long and 2 to 4 cm wide. The midrib is sunken on the top side, but raised on the lower side.

Yellow flowers without ray florets form on panicles in November to January. The fruit is a ribbed achene, whitish with bristles on the top. 8 mm long in the shape of a cigar. Fruiting occurs from December to January.

Whilst in no way related, the first impression of a healthy stand of blanket tree is strongly reminiscent of the rhododendrons of the Himalayas and China. This is due to similar growth habit, leaf arrangement and shape and is consistent with a plant which grows in the middle vegetation layers, and which has the role of shading the ground.

Following the bushfires in the summer of 2006 in the Howqua Valley, Victoria, Australia, a substantial area of forest has been colonised by Bedfordia arborescens as an understory in the eucalypt dominated valleys south of Mount Timbertop.

Taxonomy
The species was first formally described by Swiss botanist Bénédict Hochreutiner in the 5th volume of Candollea in 1934. His description was based on plant material collected from the Black Spur in Victoria in February 1905.

References

  (other publication details, included in citation)

Senecioneae
Asterales of Australia
Trees of Australia
Flora of New South Wales
Flora of Tasmania
Flora of Victoria (Australia)